Ahmed Mujdragić (Serbian Cyrillic: Ахмед Мујдрагић; born 13 March 1986) is a Serbian footballer. He is under contract with Skála IF.

External sources
 Profile at Srbijafudbal.
 Ahmed Mujdragic at Utakmica.rs
 

Living people
1986 births
Sportspeople from Novi Pazar
Bosniaks of Serbia
Serbian footballers
Association football defenders
FK Novi Pazar players
FK Hajduk Kula players
CS Gaz Metan Mediaș players
Serbian SuperLiga players
Liga I players
Expatriate footballers in Romania